Thomas LeRoy Collins (March 10, 1909 – March 12, 1991) was an American politician who served as the 33rd governor of Florida from 1955 to 1961. Collins began his governorship after winning a special election in 1954, was elected to a four-year term in 1956.

Prior to winning election as governor, Collins served several terms in the Florida House of Representatives and Senate. He was the first governor from the South to promote ending segregation. Counseling "progress under law," he took a moderate course in favor of incremental improvements during the 1950s and 60s and is remembered as a voice in favor of civil rights.

Early life
Collins, "an example of the poor boy made good," was born and raised in Tallahassee, Florida, son of a "neighborhood grocer". He attended Leon High School. He went on to attend Eastman Business College in Poughkeepsie, New York, and then the Cumberland School of Law, at that time in Lebanon, Tennessee, where he earned a law degree. In 1932, he married Mary Call Darby, great-granddaughter of Richard K. Call, twice territorial governor of Florida.

Start of career

Political start
Collins was first elected to public office in 1934, as Leon County's representative to the Florida House of Representatives. He continued to serve in the House until 1940, when he was elected to the Florida Senate to fill an unexpired term of the late William Hodges.

In 1941, he purchased The Grove Plantation, the house built by Richard K. Call in Tallahassee across the street from the Governor's Mansion. Re-elected to the Senate in 1942, Collins resigned to join the military for World War II.

Military service
Collins attempted to enlist in 1943, but was rejected by the United States Navy because of his age.  In 1944, he was accepted and received his commission as a lieutenant junior grade.  He attended officer training first in Hollywood, Florida, and then in Princeton, New Jersey.  Originally slated for assignment to a unit that would oversee post-war rebuilding of countries previously held by the Japanese, he began training in the Chinese language in Monterey, California.  When the unit was disbanded, Collins was transferred to the Navy's judge advocate general corps.  He was posted to the 13th Naval District headquarters in Seattle, Washington, where he was assigned as an attorney for Navy boards and courts.  Collins was discharged from active duty as a lieutenant in March 1946, and returned to Florida to resume his legal and political career.

Return to politics
After the war, in 1946 he was elected again to the Florida Senate. He was re-elected in 1950, serving until 1954. That year a special election was held to fill the remaining two years in the term of Governor Daniel T. McCarty, who had died in office in 1953.

Collins twice received title of "Most Valuable Senator" (the first time in 1947 by the Capital Press Corps and in 1953 by fellow lawmakers).

Governorship
Governor McCarty died just nine months after accession to the office on September 28, 1953, after suffering a debilitating heart attack on February 25. At that time, Florida had no lieutenant governor, and the president of the Florida Senate, Charley Eugene Johns, became acting governor to serve until a special election.

Collins challenged Johns in the Democratic primary election and won the nomination. Due to the disenfranchisement of most blacks in the South, the Democratic Party dominated regional politics and a primary win nearly guaranteed victory in the general election. Collins was sworn in as governor on January 4, 1955. In 1956, he was reelected to serve a regular four-year term, defeating Sumter de Leon Lowry Jr., who ran a one-issue campaign focused on opposition to integration of Florida schools. Collins was the first governor of Florida to serve two consecutive terms.

In the 1956 election, he made history by becoming the first governor to win election in the first primary election, defeating five other Democratic candidates. During his term, Collins focused on education, working to strengthen the state's school system. In the racial unrest due to the Civil Rights Movement seeking enforcement of constitutional rights, he took a moderate course, counseling obedience to the law, though gradually, to avoid disruption. The state had minimal disorder compared to other states in the Deep South.

Although he initially condemned the US Supreme Court decision in Brown v. Board of Education (1954), as did almost all Southern elected officials, he fought with the Florida Legislature to try to prevent them from passing an "interposition" resolution. This indicated the intent of the legislature to "interpose" itself between the citizens of Florida and the United States government to prevent what the legislature contended was an illegal intrusion upon the right of the state by imposing integration.

Collins used the little-known provision in Section 10 of Article Four of the state constitution by unilaterally adjourning the legislature to prevent it from passing the resolution the first time. After the legislature returned and passed the resolution, he had no power to veto it, as it was not a law but a resolution expressing the sense of the legislature.

When the interposition resolution reached his office, Collins noted on it the following, in his own handwriting:

The document is held by the State Archives of Florida.

In 1955, Collins personally reviewed the case of the Groveland Four, a case that had been unjust to four black men. Two of these men had been murdered during the case, an underage boy was given life in prison, and Walter Irvin was sentenced to death for a rape where there was little to no evidence against him. Collins decided to commute Irvin's sentence to life in prison, he explained: "My conscience told me it was a bad case, badly handled, badly tried ... I was asked to take a man's life. My conscience would not let me do it."

Collins became Chairman of the Southern Governors' Association in 1957.

Collins fell just a few votes short of persuading the first Constitution Revision Commission to send an amendment to voters to abolish capital punishment in the state. He later recalled that he worked for the amendment because every time an execution was carried out under his order, it left him feeling nearly as guilty as the murderers. His two immediate successors, C. Farris Bryant and Haydon Burns, also opposed the death penalty.

Speech on race relations, March 20, 1960
Though now remembered as a voice for civil rights, Collins in his campaign for Florida's governorship had identified as a staunch segregationist who regarded the practice as "part and parcel of our way of life." Yet biographer Martin Dyckman argues that in his speeches and statements, Collins never extolled segregation as a virtue, but defended it legalistically. For instance, although he took issue with the Supreme Court's ruling in Brown v. Board of Education, he acknowledged the court's authority. By 1957 Collins was expressing doubts that whites would universally react negatively to integration (though he still criticized the NAACP for "forcing the issue").

Tensions were mounting in Tallahassee as 1960 neared. Bus boycotts and lunch counter sit-ins were taking place in Tallahassee and across Florida. On March 20, 1960, against the advice of his friends, Collins gave an impassioned speech about his conviction that as governor he represented all the people of Florida, "whether that person is black or white, whether that person is rich or poor, or whether that person is influential or not influential." He was the first southern governor to speak so frankly in support of the moral necessity of the end of segregation. His speech generated hundreds of responses, mostly positive, from citizens across the state.

Collins' reputation as a moderate secured him the chairmanship of the 1960 Democratic National Convention. Some historians believed he had a good chance for the vice-presidential nomination, but the party nominated Lyndon Johnson in order to win Texas voters to support the ticket with John F. Kennedy from Boston.

Presidential and Vice-Presidential possibilities
During the 1956 Democratic National Convention, Collins was among contenders for the Vice Presidential nomination, when presidential nominee Adlai Stevenson II allowed the convention to choose his running-mate. Collins received 29 votes on the first ballot.

Before the 1960 presidential election, Collins was seriously considered as a possible candidate because of his popularity as a Southern governor. He was also acceptable to Northern liberals because of his support for civil rights. But he did not seek the nomination, even in the Florida primary, which went to favorite son candidate Senator George Smathers.

Chairman of the 1960 Democratic National Convention

Collins served as a chairman of the 1960 Democratic National Convention, which nominated Senator John F. Kennedy of Massachusetts for President and Senate Majority Leader Lyndon B. Johnson of Texas for Vice President.

Post-governorship
Upon completion of six years as governor, he became president of the National Association of Broadcasters. He resigned this at the request of President Lyndon B. Johnson to become the first Director of the Community Relations Service under the 1964 Civil Rights Act. Also by Presidential appointment, he became United States Under Secretary of Commerce on July 7, 1965. He resigned this position effective October 1, 1966 to return to Florida to become a partner in a Tampa law firm.

In 1968, he was nominated by the Democratic Party for the United States Senate seat vacated by fellow Democrat George Smathers. However, he lost the general election to Republican U.S. Representative Edward Gurney. Gurney partisans distributed a photograph of Collins walking alongside the Reverend Martin Luther King Jr., during the second of the March 1965 Selma to Montgomery marches in Alabama. The photograph contained no caption or other explanation of why Collins was in Selma. In fact, Collins had not participated in the march, but had shuttled back and forth between the marchers and the Alabama authorities to pursue a compromise to avoid a repeat of the violence perpetrated two days earlier, by state troopers and a deputized county posse, on the county side of the Edmund Pettus Bridge during the "Bloody Sunday" march.  He conducted these negotiations as a part of his job as head of the Community Relations Service, at the behest of President Lyndon B. Johnson. He succeeded, as the marchers were allowed to cross the bridge, pray, and return to the other side, completing the "Turnaround Tuesday" march.

A death penalty opponent, Collins participated in a protest against execution of John Spenkelink in 1979. This was the first post-Furman involuntary execution in the U.S. and the first in Florida since 1964. The protest was held outside the gubernatorial mansion he had once occupied. (Then-Governor Bob Graham let the execution proceed).
After Collins' defeat in the Senate race, he left his law firm in Tampa and returned to "The Grove" in Tallahassee, where he lived until his death from cancer in 1991. He was called "the greatest Governor of Florida" by such politicians as Florida governors Reubin Askew, Bob Graham, and Jeb Bush, who was a child in Texas at the time of Collins' governorship.

Family

His son, LeRoy Collins, Jr., a retired United States Navy rear admiral, unsuccessfully sought the 2006 Republican nomination for United States Senate from Florida, losing to Congresswoman Katherine Harris. She was defeated by Bill Nelson, the Democratic incumbent.

Legacy and honors
 
On March 19, 1991, a tribute was entered in the official record of the United States House of Representatives by Florida Representatives James Bacchus and Charles E. Bennett
His papers are held by the University of South Florida
Opening in 2017, the Governor LeRoy Collins Farm Park, situated on 84 acres of now undeveloped land in western Davie, Florida will be a public park devoted to agricultural education and open space. It will provide opportunities for experimental learning about agriculture

Works 
 Forerunners Courageous: Stories of Frontier Florida Colcade, Tallahassee, FL, 1971

References

External links
Official Governor's portrait and biography from the State of Florida
A scan and transcript of the Interposition Resolution in Response to Brown v. Board of Education, made available for public use by the State Archives of Florida.
LeRoy Collins Collection at the University of South Florida

|-

|-

|-

|-

Episcopalians from Florida
United States Navy personnel of World War II
Florida lawyers
Democratic Party Florida state senators
Democratic Party governors of Florida
Military personnel from Florida
Democratic Party members of the Florida House of Representatives
People from Tallahassee, Florida
United States Navy officers
United States Under Secretaries of Commerce
1956 United States vice-presidential candidates
Writers from Florida
1909 births
1991 deaths
20th-century American writers
20th-century American politicians
Leon High School alumni